The Bukit Dukung station (working name: Taman Koperasi station and Taman Koperasi Cuepacs station) is a mass rapid transit (MRT) station serving the suburbs of Bukit Dukung, Kampung Selamat and Sungai Balak in Kajang, Selangor, Malaysia. It is as one of the stations on Klang Valley Mass Rapid Transit (KVMRT) Kajang Line.

The station is located at Sungai Balak interchange of the Cheras–Kajang Expressway and Kajang Dispersal Link Expressway next to Petronas gas station.

Bukit Dukung MRT station have covered car park with 360 car park bays and 83 motorcycle bays.

Station Background

Station Layout 
The station has a layout and design similar to that of most other elevated stations on the line (except the terminus and underground stations), with the platform level on the topmost floor, consisting of two sheltered side platforms along a double tracked line and a single concourse housing ticketing facilities between the ground level and the platform level. All levels are linked by lifts, stairways and escalators.

Exits and entrances 
The station has two entrances. The feeder buses operate from the station's feeder bus hub via Entrance A inside the MRT Bukit Dukung Area.

Bus Services

MRT Feeder Bus Services 
With the opening of the MRT Kajang Line, feeder buses also began operating linking the station with several housing areas and cities around the Sungai Sekamat and Sungai Long area. The feeder buses operate from the station's feeder bus hub accessed via Entrance A of the station.

Other Bus Services 
The MRT Bukit Dukung station also provides accessibility for some other bus services. There is also a shuttle bus service connecting the station to UTAR Sungai Long campus.

Gallery

References

External links
 Bukit Dukung Station - mrt.com.my

Rapid transit stations in Selangor
Sungai Buloh-Kajang Line
Railway stations opened in 2017
2017 establishments in Malaysia